Mahali Marup railway station is a railway station on Howrah–Nagpur–Mumbai line under Chakradharpur railway division of South Eastern Railway zone. It is situated at Mahali Marup, Seraikela Kharsawan district in the Indian state of Jharkhand.

References

Railway stations in Seraikela Kharsawan district
Chakradharpur railway division